Blue Blazes is a 1926 American silent Western film directed by Joseph Franz and Milburn Morante and starring Pete Morrison, Jim Welch, and Barbara Starr.

Plot
As described in a film magazine review, Grace Macy searches for money hidden by her grandfather just before he was killed by thieves. She hears a dying criminal's confession which brands McKeller as the murderer. Buck Fitzgerald offers to help her. Dee Halloran knows that McKeller is innocent. Buck attacks Grace to obtain the confession, but she escapes to Death Wash, where her grandfather's deserted cabin is located, pursued by Buck and his men. Dee comes to the rescue of Grace, locates the missing money, and wins her affection.

Cast
 Pete Morrison as Dee Halloran 
 Jim Welch as McKeller 
 Barbara Starr as Grace Macy 
 Dick La Reno Jr. as Jess Macy 
 Les Bates as Buck Fitzgerald
 Jerome La Grasse as Matt Bunker 
 James B. Lowe as Rastus

References

External links
 
 

1926 films
1926 Western (genre) films
Universal Pictures films
Films directed by Milburn Morante
American black-and-white films
Films directed by Joseph Franz
Silent American Western (genre) films
1920s English-language films
1920s American films